Peerapong Panyanumaporn, is a Thai professional footballer who plays as a winger for Muangthong United.

References

External links
 

1996 births
Living people
Peerapong Panyanumaporn
Peerapong Panyanumaporn
Association football midfielders
Peerapong Panyanumaporn
Peerapong Panyanumaporn
Peerapong Panyanumaporn